Edigan (Eĵegan) is a rural locality (a selo) in Kuyusskoye Rural Settlement of Chemalsky District, the Altai Republic, Russia. The population was 246 as of 2016. There are 5 streets.

Geography 
Edigan is located in the valley of the Edigan River, 53 km southeast of Chemal (the district's administrative centre) by road. Kuyus is the nearest rural locality.

References 

Rural localities in Chemalsky District